Wendy Kimani (born 18 May 1986) is a Kenyan singer, songwriter, actress and entertainer. She came into prominence after being the first runners-up in the second season of Tusker Project Fame. As a singer she is known for her songs; "Haiwi Haiwi", "Chali" among others. She released her debut album dubbed as My Essence launched in August 2013. As an actress she is known for starring in the television series, Rush.

Early life 
Kimani was born in 1986 and raised in Nairobi, in Kenya. She developed her singing talent by listening to other musicians.

Career

2008: Tusker Project Fame 
In March 2008, Wendy and other participants battled out at the TPF 2 auditions where she was chosen both at the audition and at the eviction gala. After 71 days of working in the academy, she was only put on probation twice (the second time every single remaining contestant was put on probation for the semi-finals by the then judges). On 22 June 2008, Kimani lost out the coveted price of ksh 5 million among others, to Esther Nabaasa, a Ugandan. Among the finalists were the latter, David as the second runners-up and Victor took the fourth position.

201213 
On 13 August 2013, Kimani released her debut album, My Essence, stylized as ME.

2014 
In February 2014, she, Lenana Kariba and Charles Kiarie starred in television film, Die Husband Die!, a story about Lynette (Kimani) living a loveless marriage with a much elder man (Charles Kiarie), that she falls in love with a younger man (Lenana Kariba).  On 20 May 2014, Kimani featured Sauti Sol's Bien Aime in her new single "Haiwi Haiwi". The song was shot and directed by Mushking. In November that year, she released her second single for 2014, "Chali", shot and directed by Enos Olik. The song is a bit old school and has some jazz chords.

2015present 
In early April 2015, Gilad Millo an Israeli former deputy ambassador based in Kenya, featured Kimani his hit single "Unajua", a Swahili word for "Do You Know". A song that talked about two former lovers contemplating about their current love life gone sour. The song was critically acclaimed, a massive hit and receiving much air play in both radio and television stations making it one of Kenya's best 2015 songs.

Personal life 
Kimani married her long term Dutch fiancé Marvin Onderwater on 9 August 2014 in Nairobi.

Discography

Filmography

Notes

References

External links 
Wendy Kimani at SoundCloud

1986 births
Living people
Kenyan television actresses
Kenyan film actresses
21st-century Kenyan actresses
People from Nairobi
Kikuyu people
21st-century Kenyan women singers
Musicians from Nairobi